The Mahecola barb (Puntius mahecola) is a species of ray-finned fish in the genus Puntius. It is found in Kerala, India.

References 

Puntius
Taxa named by Achille Valenciennes
Fish described in 1844